In linguistics, case government is government of the grammatical case of a noun, wherein a verb or adposition is said to 'govern' the grammatical case of its noun phrase complement, e.g. in German the preposition  'for' governs the accusative case:  'for me-accusative'. Case government may modify the meaning of the verb substantially, even to meanings that are unrelated.

Case government is an important notion in languages with many case distinctions, such as Russian and Finnish. It plays less of a role in English, because English does not rely on grammatical cases, except for distinguishing subject pronouns (I, he, she, we, they) from other pronouns (me, him, her, us, them). In English, true case government is absent, but if the aforementioned subject pronouns are understood as regular pronouns in the accusative case, it occurs in sentences such as He found me (not for example *He found I).

Adpositions 

In Standard German, there are prepositions which govern each of the three oblique cases: Accusative, Dative, and Genitive. Case marking in German is largely observed on elements which modify the noun (e.g. determiners, adjectives).  In the following table, examples of Löffel 'spoon' (Masculine), Messer 'knife' (Neuter), and Gabel 'fork' (Feminine) are in definite noun phrases for each of the four cases.  In the oblique cases (i.e. non-Nominative), the prepositions supplied dictate different cases: ohne 'without' governs the accusative, mit 'with' governs the dative, and wegen 'because of' governs the genitive:

There are also two-way prepositions which govern the dative when the prepositional phrase denotes location (where at?), but the accusative when it denotes direction (to/from where?).

Verbs 

In Finnish, certain verbs or groups of verbs require associated objects to employ particular cases or case-like suffixes regardless of the circumstances in which a case is normally used.

In books on Finnish grammar written in Finnish the phenomenon of case government is usually referred to as "", from the Latin
 (control or governance).

See also
 Government
 Grammatical case
 Theta role

References

 

Grammar